Assassination Classroom is a Japanese manga series written and illustrated by Yūsei Matsui. It follows the daily lives of an extremely powerful octopus-like teacher and his students dedicated to the task of assassinating him to prevent Earth from being destroyed.

Individual chapters have been serialized in Weekly Shōnen Jump since July 2012, and are collected into tankōbon volumes published by Shueisha. As of June 2016, twenty volumes have been released in Japan with a circulation of ten million copies. The manga has been licensed by Viz Media for an English language North American release, who released the first volume in December 2014 in both digital and print formats.

Releases

References

Assassination Classroom
Assassination Classroom